Aleksandr Vlasov (20 January 1932 – 9 June 2002) was a Soviet politician, who held different cabinet posts, including interior minister and prime minister. He was the last communist prime minister of Russia, and a close ally of Mikhail Gorbachev.

Early life and education
Vlasov was born into a Russian family in Babushkin, Buryat-Mongol ASSR, Russian SFSR (now Buryatia, Russia) on 20 January 1932. He attended the Irkutsk Mining Metallurgical Institute and graduated with a degree in mining engineering in 1954.

Career
Vlasov worked as a foreman in an eastern Siberia mine. He left the job less than in a year and joined the Communist Party in 1956. Then he began to work in the Komsomol.

In 1965, Vlasov was named as second secretary of Yakut party obkom. He also worked a member of the military council of the North Caucasian military district when Gorbachev was working there. Vlasov began to work at the central committee of the Communist Party in Moscow from 1972. He was promoted to first secretary of the party in 1975. Then Vlasov became first secretary of the party in Rostov in southern Russia in 1984.

In January 1986, Vlasov was appointed interior minister, replacing Vitaly Fedorchuk in the post. Then Vlasov was appointed to the Politburo as a non-voting member in late September 1988. His tenure as interior minister lasted until 10 October 1988. Vadim Bakatin replaced him as interior minister.

Vlasov was elected as prime minister of the Russian Republic by the Supreme Soviet on 3 October 1988. He succeeded Vitaly Vorotnikov in the post.

Vlasov was nominated for presidency of the Supreme Soviet in May 1990. However, he lost the election to Boris Yeltsin who outpolled him, 535 votes to 467, receiving just 4 votes more than the minimum required for election.

Decorations and awards
 Order of Lenin
 Order of the October Revolution
 Order of the Badge of Honour, twice

References

External links

20th-century Russian engineers
1932 births
2002 deaths
Burials in Troyekurovskoye Cemetery
Heads of government of the Russian Soviet Federative Socialist Republic
People from Buryatia
Soviet Ministers of Internal Affairs
Politburo of the Central Committee of the Communist Party of the Soviet Union members
Recipients of the Order of Lenin
Russian mining engineers
Soviet engineers